Nafi bin Sarjis Abu Abdullah ad-Dailami, also known as Nafi` Mawla ibn `Umar, was a scholar of Fiqh jurisprudence and muhaddith from the Tabiun generation who resided in Medina.

Biography 
Nafi was originally a resident of Daylam (now including the Gilan region in Iran) who was captured during Muslim conquest of Persia and became a slave before being manumitted by Abdullah ibn Umar. He studied religion from the Companions of the Prophet, and especially from Abdullah bin Umar and Abu Sa'id al-Khudri. 

He became a teacher for prominent scholars such as Ibn Shihab al-Zuhri, Ayyub as-Sakhtiyani, and Malik ibn Anas.   

He became Mufti during the caliphate of Umar ibn Abdul Aziz and was sent by caliph to teach Islam to peoples in Egypt.

Golden Chain of Narration 

Malik's chain of narrators was considered the most authentic and called Silsilat al-Dhahab or "The Golden Chain of Narrators" by notable hadith scholars including Muhammad al-Bukhari. The 'Golden Chain' of narration (i.e., that considered by the scholars of Hadith to be the most authentic) consists of Malik, who narrated from Nafi‘ Mawla ibn ‘Umar, who narrated from Ibn Umar, who narrated from Muhammad.

Malik even goes as far to says : “If I heard (hadith) from Nafi’ narrating from Ibn Umar, I would not care if I did not hear it from someone else(as it is undoubtly authentic).”

Scholars such as al-Bukhari, al-Asqalani and Abu Ali al-Khalil have high confidence for hadiths authenticity narrated by Nafi. Sahih bukhari and Sahih Muslim contained at least 188 hadiths of various matters narrated by Nafi.

Modern researchers of Hadiths has attested the hadiths narrated from Nafi line were authentic by using method of Ibn Hajar al-Asqalani of Jarh wa Ta'dil(narrators biography evaluation). Ze'ev Maghen stated the authenticity of Nafi narration were "almost peerless", while Professor Bashar Awad, editor of Tirmidhi collection, and winner of King Faisal Prize award, also noted the "golden chain" of Nafi were supported by another Tabi'un to Sahaba chains.

Death 
Nafi is estimated to have died in 117 AH (735-6 AD), although there are other chroniclers who say that in 120 H.

See also 
 Wahb ibn Munabbih
 Maliki Madhhab

References

Bibliography 
 

 

 

 

 

 

 

 

Tabi‘un hadith narrators
8th-century Muslim theologians
Hadith scholars
Iranian historians of Islam
8th-century Iranian people
Scholars from the Umayyad Caliphate
Sunni imams
Sunni Muslim scholars of Islam
Converts to Islam
People from the Rashidun Caliphate
Daylamites